is a Japanese actress, voice actress and singer. She is managed by Link Plan Inc, a subsidiary of Pro-Fit.

Career 
In 2011, Ōnishi had a starring role in NHK's . In 2013 Junior High School Diaries won an International Emmy Kids Award in the series category.

Ōnishi was a finalist in the 13th Japan Bishojo Contest in 2012, which led to her becoming part of an idol group called X21. The group was made up of all of the other finalists from the contest. They began performing in January 2013. She graduated from both X21 and the production agency Oscar Promotion on April 16, 2017.

She began working with Link Plan in July 2017, after completing Pro-Fit's training course. Ōnishi made her debut as a voice actress later that year as Miu Ichinose in the YomeKura drama CD. She was also announced to be the voice of Ayumu Uehara in Love Live's "Perfect Dream Project" idol group, which would be later known as Nijigasaki High School Idol Club.

From 2019 to November 14, 2020, she was a member of the voice actress unit Prima Porta.

On November 22, 2020, it was announced that Ōnishi will be making her debut as a solo singer under Nippon Columbia, with the release of her first single, "Honjitsu wa Seiten Nari" (本日は晴天なり), on March 3, 2021.

Personal life 
Ōnishi's hobbies are reading, karaoke, and playing the alto saxophone.

Filmography

TV Dramas 
Junior High School Diaries (中学生日記) (2011) as herself
 Saki (2016-2017) as Satomi Kanbara

Movies 
 Saki (2017) as Satomi Kanbara

Anime 
 Ms. Koizumi Loves Ramen Noodles (2018) as Female Student C
 Tada Never Falls in Love (2018) as Female Student
 Caligula (2018) as Elementary School Student
 Afterlost (2019) as Rena
 Love Live! Nijigasaki High School Idol Club (2020) as Ayumu Uehara
 Maesetsu! (2020) as Fubuki Kitakaze
 Love Live! Nijigasaki High School Idol Club 2nd Season (2022) as Ayumu Uehara
 Don't Hurt Me, My Healer! (2022) as Carla

Video games 
PlayStation All-Stars Battle Royale (2012) as Toro Inoue
Shironeko Project (2018) as Danby
[[Love Live! School Idol Festival|Love Live School Idol Festival ALL STARS]] (2019) as Ayumu UeharaMagia Record (2020) as Sunao Toki

 Drama CD YomeKura'' (2017) as Miu Ichinose

References

External links 
 Official website 
 Official agency profile 
 Official music website 

1997 births
Living people
Japanese video game actresses
Japanese voice actresses
Nijigasaki High School Idol Club members
Voice actresses from Aichi Prefecture
21st-century Japanese actresses
Nippon Columbia artists